Æethelred of East Anglia may refer to:

 Æthelred I of East Anglia fl. c760s-780s
 Æthelred II of East Anglia fl. c 875